The Lamet people are an ethnic group in Thailand and Laos.

Name Variations
Lamet are also often referred to as:
Lamed
Khamet
Khamed

Geographic Distribution
There are approximately 22,000 Lamet in the Louang Namtha Province, Oudomxai and Bokeo Provinces of Laos. There are also approximately 100 Lamet in Thailand in the Chiang Rai and Lampang Provinces. There are also 90 Lamet in the United States and 30 in France. In Laos, the Lamet are a hill tribe.

Origin
The Lamet claim to be an indigenous population to northwestern Laos.  They are a Palaungic ethnic group.

Language

The Lamet speak an Austroasiatic language related to Palaung and Wa. Most adult males also speak Tai Yuan.

Economy
The Lamet practice slash-and-burn agriculture, as well as hunting, gathering and fishing. The Lamet trade with the Lao and Thai to obtain their necessaries. Some Lamet also work for wages.

Religions
Animism

Marriage customs
After marriage, the newly married Lamet man moves into his wife's family home and works for her father. He then begins to make marriage payments up to a fixed amount, after which the couple either moves in with the husband's parents, or the couple makes a new household.

Significance of Wealth
Wealth is considered an important characteristic among male Lamet.  For the Lamet, wealth is measured by one's inventory of buffalo, chimes, and bronze drums.

References

External links 
 http://projekt.ht.lu.se/rwaai RWAAI (Repository and Workspace for Austroasiatic Intangible Heritage)
 http://hdl.handle.net/10050/00-0000-0000-0003-66ED-E@view Lamet in RWAAI Digital Archive

Ethnic groups in Thailand
Palaung people